Hélène Lindqvist (born 1968 in Stockholm, Sweden) is a Swedish soprano singing opera, operetta, oratorio, art song and musical theatre.

Biography and Artistic Work 
Lindqvist is of Swedish and Egyptian descent. She began her vocal training in Stockholm with the Florence Düselius. She then studied at the University of Music in Saarbrücken, Germany and at the Mozarteum in Salzburg, Austria. While there in 1995, she passed the exam to be a soloist in the musical theater. She took singing lessons with Jessica Cash, Éva Marton and Bernd Weikl, in addition to Prof. Renate Stoll-Bellmann.

Hélène Lindqvist had her first engagements at the Frankfurt Chamber Opera, the Norddeutscher Rundfunk (NDR) and the Ensemble Alta Musica Frankfurt. From 1996 to 1999 she was a permanent member of the Saarland State Theater. There she sang the following roles: Ännchen in Der Freischütz, Ilia in Idomeneo, Kriemhild in the operetta The Merry Nibelungs, Belinda in Dido and Aeneas, the Hitomaru in the Die Reise and other supporting roles. She had a guest engagement at Theater Regensburg for 2001/2002 and 2009/2010, where she sang Gilda in Rigoletto, Franziska Cagliari in Wiener Blut, Morgana in Alcina, Nuri in Tiefland and Tatyana in Eugene Onegin. Additional guest engagements followed at the Hamburg State Opera as Damigella/Fortuna in The Coronation of Poppea, and the City Theater Augsburg as Gilda in Rigoletto.

Her extensive repertoire includes many Baroque operas, including Henry Purcell, George Frideric Handel and Claudio Monteverdi. She also sang roles as Donna Anna (Don Giovanni), Violetta (La Traviata), Fiordiligi (Così Fan Tutte), Michaela (Carmen), Desdemona (Otello), etc.

In 2004 Hélène Lindqvist undertook a tour of Japan, where she appeared as The Countess in The Marriage of Figaro. In addition, the artist took a concert tour through Egypt.

From 2006 to 2009, Lindqvist was a regular ensemble member of the Theater Ulm. While there, she sang, among others, the parts of Kostanze in The Abduction from the Seraglio, Ninetta in The Love for Three Oranges, Gilda in Rigoletto, (als steppende) Electress Marie in Der Vogelhändler, Fiorilla in Il turco in Italia, Alcina in Alcina, Euridice in Orfeo ed Euridice and also Mary Magdalene in Jesus Christ Superstar.

Meanwhile, as a freelance artist, Lindqvist is in demand, both in Germany and abroad, as a concert and art song singer. Her repertoire reaches from the early Baroque, concerning sacred compositions, through the modern period. This encompasses works by Johann Sebastian Bach, Anton Bruckner, Claudio Monteverdi, Arnold Schönberg, Gustav Mahler, Gunnar de Frumerie, Alban Berg, Dimitri Terzakis, Antonín Dvořák, Lili Boulanger and Nadia Boulanger.

The Art Song Project 
In 2000, Lindqvist married pianist Philipp Vogler, a colleague at the opera house in Saarbrücken. They have two daughters, Mimi and Josefin, who won the seventh season of The Voice-Kids Deutschland in 2019.

In 2011 Lindqvist and her husband started The Art Song Project. The site is intended to bring the works of lesser known art song composers to the attention of the public. In 2012, the duo released a CD recording of Anton Rubinstein's "Persian Love Songs" to generally positive reviews. And in 2013, they released another CD, of 24 lieder by Heinrich von Herzogenberg.

Awards 
 First Prize in the international art song competition, Concerto delle donne in Kassel, Germany
 Second Prize in the Walter Gieseking Competition in Saarbrücken, Germany
 Finalist in the Marjorie Lawrence Competition in Washington, D.C.

Discography 
 Alban Berg: Jugendlieder (Label Col Legno; 2006)
 Gustav Mahler: Symphony no. 4 Taschenphilharmonie/Stangel (NEOS 2005)
 Dimitri Terzakis: Daphnis and Chloe: Solo for Soprano no. 2; Songs without Words (Col Legno 2005)
 Gunnar de Frumerie, Songs: Phoenix No. 1 (Valve-Hearts 1997)

External links 
 
 http://www.helenelindqvist.com/
 http://TheArtSongProject.com/
 http://www.agenturklein.de/kuenstler/soprane/helene-lindqvist/biografie/
 http://musikfreunde-bremen.de/helenelindqvist.html

References 

Swedish sopranos
Living people
Singers from Stockholm
1968 births